Biotech and pharmaceutical companies in the New York metropolitan area represent a significant and growing economic component of the New York metropolitan area, the most populous combined statistical area in the United States and one of the most populous megacities in the world.

The biotechnology sector is growing in the New York City area, based upon the region's strength in academic scientific research and public and commercial financial support. The New York City Economic Development Corporation's Early Stage Life Sciences Funding Initiative and venture capital partners, including Celgene, General Electric Ventures, and Eli Lilly, committed a minimum of US$100 million to help launch 15 to 20 ventures in life sciences and biotechnology in 2014, and in January 2018, the City of New York itself committed up to US$100 million into the venture.

In December 2014, the State of New York announced a US$50 million venture-capital fund to encourage enterprises working in biotechnology and advanced materials; according to Governor Andrew Cuomo, the seed money would facilitate entrepreneurs in bringing their research into the marketplace.

New Jersey has a nickname "Medicine Chest of the World" due to its large workforce in biopharmaceutical industry. As of 2019, twelve of top 20 biopharmaceutical companies in the world has U.S. headquarters in the state.

Below is a list of notable New York metropolitan area biotechnology and pharmaceutical corporations, including companies with either global or U.S. headquarters in the metropolitan region encompassing and surrounding New York City.

Biotechnology

Connecticut
 Arvinas()
 Biohaven()
 Loxo Oncology()
 Purdue Pharma
 SpringWorks Therapeutics

New Jersey
 Acino
 Adma Biologics()
 Aerie Pharmaceuticals()
 AIM ImmunoTech
 Akorn
 Akrimax
 Allergan
 Alvogen
 Amarin 
 Amicus Therapeutics() 
 Amneal Pharmaceuticals()
 Angel Medical Systems
 Apicore
 Aphena Pharma Solutions
 Aquestive Therapeutics
 Ascendia Pharmaceuticals
 Aucta Pharmaceuticals
 AustarPharma
 Bausch & Lomb
 Becton Dickinson()
 Belrose Pharma
 Bezwada Biomedical
 BioAegis Therapeutics
 BrainStorm Cell Therapeutics()
 Cambrex
 Cancer Genetics
 Castle Creek Pharma
 Catalent()
 Celerion
 Celgene
 Celldex Therapeutics()
 Celvive
 Certara()
 Champions Oncology
 ChromoCell
 Chugai Pharma()
 Citius Pharmaceuticals()
 Citron Pharma
 Collagen matrix
 ContraVir
 Covance
 C.R. Bard
 Crystal Pharmatech
 Cyclacel Pharmaceuticals()
 Diagenode
 DPT Laboratories
 Dr. Reddy's Laboratories()
 Drais Pharmaceuticals
 EAG Laboratories
 Elite Pharmaceuticals
 Emergent BioSolutions()
 Endomedix
 Enzon Pharmaceuticals()
 Ethicon Inc.
 Ferring Pharmaceuticals
 Frontage
 Genewiz
 Genmab()
 GenScript
 Glenmark Pharmaceuticals()
 Global Pharma Tek
 Grace Therapeutics
 Helsinn
 Heritage Pharmaceuticals 
 Hovione
 Hudson BioPharma
 Immunomedics
 Impax Laboratories
 Integra Life Sciences
 Intercept Pharmaceuticals()
 Kashiv Pharma
 LabVantage
 Leading Pharma
 Lonza
 MakroCare
 Medicure
 Menssana Research
 Mitsubishi Tanabe Pharma
 Ohm Laboratories
 Oncobiologics
 Ortho Clinical Diagnostics
 Orthobond
 Oyster Point Pharma()
 Palatin Technologies
 Parexel
 PBL Assay Science
 PDS Biotechnology
 Pearl Therapeutics (AstraZeneca)
 Pernix Therapeutics Holdings()
 Pharsight
 Phibro Animal Health()
 Photocure
 Precision Oncology
 Prolong Pharmaceuticals
 Promius Pharma
 PTC Therapeutics
 QPharma  Morristown
 Raphael Pharmaceuticals
 RiconPharma
 Roche Molecular Systems
 Salvona
 Sandoz (Novartis)
 Scienion
 Shionogi
 Soligenix()
 Stryker()
 Sun Pharmaceuticals
 Scynexis()
 Taiho Oncology
 Tara Innovations
 Terumo Medical
 3D Biotek
 The Medicines Company
 ThromboGenics
 TKL Research
 Tris Pharma
 Validus Pharmaceuticals
 VaxInnate
 West-Ward (HIKMA)
 WuXi Biologics
 Worthington Biochemical
 XenoBiotic Laboratories (WuXi Apptec)
 Zoetis

New York
 AccuVein
 Aceto 
 Acorda Therapeutics
 Actinium Pharmaceuticals()
 Affina Biotechnologies
 AJES Life Sciences 
 Akari Therapeutics() 
 Alpha-1 Biologics 
 American Regent 
 Amicus Therapeutics()
 Anavex Life Sciences
 Angion Biomedica 
 Applied DNA Sciences()
 Armgo Pharma   
 Axios Oncology
 Azure Biotech
 AzurRx Biopharma()
 Bantam Pharmaceutical
 Bioreclamation
 BioSpecifics
 Caladrius Biosciences()
 Cellectis()
 Certerra
 Chembio Diagnostic Systems  
 Clinilabs
 Clinuvel Pharmaceuticals()
 Codagenix  
 ContraFect()  
 Charles River Laboratories()
 Creative Biogene   
 Creative Biolabs  
 Creative Diagnostics   
 Creative Enzymes
 Cynvec
 DanDrit
 Dipexium Pharmaceuticals
 Dompé
 Ember Therapeutics
 Endo Pharmaceuticals()
 Envisagenics
 Gene Link 
 Iberica US
 iCell Gene Therapeutics  
 ICON Clinical Research()
 Immtech Pharmaceuticals
 Intellect Neurosciences
 Innovimmune Biotherapeutics
 Intra-Cellular Therapies()
 Kallyope 
 Kyras Therapeutics
 Lucerna
 Mesoblast()
 Microlin Bio
 Mispro Biotech 
 Motif BioSciences 
 Lixte Biotechnology
 Ohr Pharmaceuticals
 Oligomerix
 Ovid Therapeutics()
 Progyny()
 PsychoGenics 
 Q BioMed
 Relmada Therapeutics
 Regeneron Pharmaceuticals
 RGenix
 S1 Biopharma
 Seelos Therapeutics()
 Siga()  
 SolveBio 
 Synergy Pharmaceuticals
 Tactical Therapeutics 
 Tara Biosystems 
 TechnoVax 
 TG Therapeutics 
 Tonix Pharmaceuticals()
 Travere Therapeutics
 Savage Laboratories (Fougera)
 Theragnostic Technologies
 TheraSource
 United Biomedical

Pharmaceutical corporations

Connecticut
 Boehringer Ingelheim

New Jersey
 Aurobindo Pharma
 Barr Pharmaceuticals
 Bayer
 Daiichi Sankyo
 Eisai
Eli Lilly and Company
 Janssen Pharmaceuticals (J&J)
 Johnson & Johnson
 Merck & Co.
 Novartis Pharmaceuticals
 Orexo
 Ortho-McNeil Pharmaceutical (J&J)
 Paion
 Par Pharmaceutical
 Sanofi
 Teva (planned move to Parsippany-Troy Hills, New Jersey)
 The Medicines Company
 Valeant
 Zoetis

New York
 Bristol-Myers Squibb
 Pfizer
 Turing Pharmaceuticals

See also

 Tech companies in the New York metropolitan area

References

Biotechnology companies of the United States
Companies based in New York City
Pharmaceutical companies of the United States
Pharmaceutical companies based in New Jersey
New York City-related lists